Mirza Asadullayev Shamsi oghlu (1875–1936) was an Azerbaijani industrial magnate, philanthropist and statesman who served as Minister of Industry and Trade in the third cabinet of Azerbaijan Democratic Republic, and was member of Parliament of Azerbaijan.

Early years
Asadullayev was born in 1875 in Baku, Azerbaijan to the family of famous oil magnate Shamsi Asadullayev. After graduating from a Baku gymnasium, he worked for his father's oil company. In early 1900s, he married the daughter of another oil magnate Musa Nagiyev, Umm-El-Banine Assadoulaeff. Due to his father's oil business, Asadullayev has spent considerable time living in Moscow and St. Petersburg. He also chaired the Muslim Charity Society organization. After the February revolution in Russia, Asadullayev was elected a member to the Executive Committee of the Interim Muslim National Council. In 1918, he was elected chairman of Baku Oil Industry Council.

Political career
After establishment of Azerbaijan Democratic Republic, he played an important role in the economy of the country. On December 26, when the third cabinet led by Fatali Khan Khoyski was formed, Asadullayev was appointed the Minister of Industry and Trade of ADR. He's recognized as an important contributor in development of industry sector of Azerbaijan. 
After Bolshevik occupation of Azerbaijan in 1920, Asadullayev was arrested and imprisoned. He was released the same year and with permission from the authorities, was allowed to leave the country.

Asadullayev settled in Paris where he lived until his death in 1936.

See also
Azerbaijani National Council
Cabinets of Azerbaijan Democratic Republic (1918-1920)
Current Cabinet of Azerbaijan Republic

References

1875 births
1936 deaths
Azerbaijan Democratic Republic politicians
Government ministers of Azerbaijan
Businesspeople from Baku
Engineers from Baku
Azerbaijani businesspeople in the oil industry
Politicians from Baku
Azerbaijani philanthropists
Soviet emigrants to France
Members of the National Assembly of the Azerbaijan Democratic Republic